Patrick Nys (born 25 January 1969) is a Belgian former football goalkeeper who lasted played for F.C. Brussels. As of the summer of 2010, he is a goalkeeper coach with Antwerp FC.

Honours 
 Lierse S.K.
Belgian Super Cup (1): 1999
 Gençlerbirliği
Turkish Cup (1): 2001

References

Belgian footballers
Association football goalkeepers
Gençlerbirliği S.K. footballers
R.W.D.M. Brussels F.C. players
Lierse S.K. players
Living people
1969 births
K.F.C. Dessel Sport players
Sportspeople from Turnhout
Footballers from Antwerp Province